The Joseph M. Frank House is a historic house at 912 West Fourth Street in Little Rock, Arkansas.  It is a two-story wood-frame structure, with a brick veneer exterior, and asymmetrical massing typical of the Queen Anne style.  It has a variety of gabled projections, recesses, and porches, as well as a projecting angled corner turret.  A single-story porch extending across part of the front is supported by Colonial Revival Ionic columns.  The house was built in 1900 for a local businessman, and was for many years divided into apartments or professional offices.

The house was listed on the National Register of Historic Places in 1985.

See also
National Register of Historic Places listings in Little Rock, Arkansas

References

Houses on the National Register of Historic Places in Arkansas
Queen Anne architecture in Arkansas
Neoclassical architecture in Arkansas
Houses completed in 1900
Houses in Little Rock, Arkansas
National Register of Historic Places in Little Rock, Arkansas